The Hokkaido at-large district is a constituency of the House of Councillors in the Diet of Japan (national legislature). It consists of the prefecture (dō) of Hokkai[dō] and is represented by six Councillors electing three at a time every three years by single non-transferable vote for six-year terms. In the election period from 2019 to 2022, Hokkaido's Councillors are (party affiliation as of September 2019):
 Gaku Hasegawa (LDP, Hosoda faction; term ends in 2022),
 Eri Tokunaga (DPFP; term ends in 2022), 
 Yoshio Hachiro (CDP; term ends in 2022),
 Harumi Takahashi (LDP; term ends in 2025),
 Kenji Katsube (CDP; term ends in 2025) and
 Tsuyohito Iwamoto (LDP; term ends in 2025).

After the House of Councillors had replaced the House of Peers according to the constitution of 1947, Hokkaido was represented by eight Councillors. In the early years of the 1955 System, all four seats went to the two major postwar parties, the Liberal Democratic Party (LDP) and the Japan Socialist Party (JSP). But smaller parties such as the Japanese Communist Party (JCP) had a chance to pick up seats in Hokkaido as the vote share sufficient to gain a seat was often significantly below 20 percent. The high number of candidates increased the risk of vote splitting for the major parties: In 1974, two incumbent LDP candidates and conservative independent Tatsuo Takahashi ranked 5th, 6th and 7th leaving all four seats to the center-left to left opposition parties Kōmeitō, JSP and JCP.

In a major reapportionment in 1994 the number of Councillors from Hokkaido was halved to four. It became effective in the 1995 and 1998 elections. During the period as two-member district, Hokkaidō usually split seats evenly between opposition and ruling parties like most two-member districts – although the Democrats unsuccessfully aimed for both seats in the 2004, 2007 and 2010 elections. In another 2015 reapportionment, effective in the two classes from the 2016 and 2019 elections, Hokkaidō's representation in the upper house was raised to six.

Elected Councillors

Recent election results 
Notes:
 Decimals from anbunhyō ("fractional proportional votes" from ambiguous votes) omitted; note that the rounded whole numbers may still include fractions of numbers >2 of ambiguous votes and do not necessarily represent "whole" voters
 (2016 only) (*): ineligible as runner-up replacement (kuriage-tōsen), lost deposit

References 
 House of Councillors: Alphabetical list of former Councillors

Districts of the House of Councillors (Japan)
Politics of Hokkaido